The 1951 Taça de Portugal Final was the final match of the 1950–51 Taça de Portugal, the 11th season of the Taça de Portugal, the premier Portuguese football cup competition organized by the Portuguese Football Federation (FPF). The match was played on 10 June 1951 at the Estádio Nacional in Oeiras, and opposed two Primeira Liga sides: Académica and Benfica. Benfica defeated Académica 5–1 to claim their fifth Taça de Portugal.

Match

Details

References

1951
Taca
S.L. Benfica matches
Associação Académica de Coimbra – O.A.F. matches